Abel Salazar García (24 September 1917 – 21 October 1995) was a Mexican actor, producer and director. He appeared in 70 films between 1941 and 1989. He was a son of Don García and his wife, and brother to Don Alfredo Salazar.

Personal life
After marriages to Alicia Cárdenas and Gloria Marín, he married, lastly, Rosita Arenas, who had been briefly married to Spanish actor Jaime de Mora y Aragón. Salazar and Arenas had a daughter, Rosa Salazar Arenas, a Mexican actress and screenwriter. and is a writer of the Mexican Spanish-language soap opera Llena de amor (English title: Fill me with love), produced by Televisa, that began airing in 2010. She co-authored Rituales Para El Amor, La Belleza y La Prosperidad (1998), with Pita Ojeda. He died of respiratory failure and Alzheimer's disease in 1995.

Selected filmography

 La casa del Rencor (1941)
 La Virgen morena (1942)
 Capullito de Alhelí (1944)
 Los tres García (1946)
 Mi esposa busca novio (1947)
 La Panchita (1948)
 Me ha besado un hombre (1949)
 Una viuda sin sostén (1950)
 What Has That Woman Done to You? (1951)
 La Duquesa del Tepetate (1951)
 Canasta uruguaya (1951)
 Seven Women (1953)
 Mañana cuando amanezca (1954)
 The Coyote (1955)
 El vampiro (1957)
 El hombre y el monstruo (1958)
 The White Renegade (1960)
 El mundo de los vampiros (The World Of The Vampires) (1961)
 The Curse of the Crying Woman (La maldición de la llorona) (1961)
 The Brainiac (El baron del terror) (1962)
 The Adolescents (1968)  director
 Tres Mujeres en la Hoguera (1976)
 Ya Nunca Mas (Never Again) (1984) director -- marks the film debut of Luis Miguel.

References

External links

1917 births
1995 deaths
Mexican male film actors
Mexican film directors
Mexican film producers
Male actors from Mexico City
20th-century Mexican male actors
Deaths from Alzheimer's disease
Deaths from dementia in Mexico